Bumadizone, or bumazidone, is a nonsteroidal anti-inflammatory drug (NSAID).

References

Hydrazides
Nonsteroidal anti-inflammatory drugs